Chris Smith (September 8, 1999) is an American football running back for the Louisiana Ragin' Cajuns.

Early life and high school
Smith was born on September 8, 1999, in Meridian, Mississippi. He attended Nanih Waiya High School, being named the 2016 "Mr. Football".

College career

2018–2019
Smith committed to the University of Louisiana at Lafayette, spending his first year as a redshirt and appearing in four games. As a redshirt freshman in 2019, Smith appeared in every game of the season and placed fourth on the roster with 334 rushing yards. He ran for four touchdowns on the year.

2020–2021
In 2020, Smith appeared in all 11 games for the school and served as their return specialist and third running back. As a returner, Smith made 23 kick returns for 617 yards and two touchdowns, and twice earned conference special teams player of the week honors. He finished the season with 1,137 all-purpose yards, 30th most in the nation. Following the season, he was named a first-team All-America selection by CBS and 247Sports.com.

In 2021, Smith earned the starting running back role and led the team with 855 rushing yards on the year. In a 28–27 win over Arkansas State, he ran for a career-high 238 yards and two touchdowns.

References

1999 births
Living people
American football running backs
Louisiana Ragin' Cajuns football players
Players of American football from Mississippi